The Auxiliary Organizations Association (AOA) is a supraorganization consisting of member organizations which are auxiliaries to the 23 campuses in the California State University system. There are over 90 member organizations including foundations, students' unions, student governments, and other corporations. 

The member organizations are hybrid organizations, in that they are 501(c)(3) corporations that provide services to state university campuses, which are public agencies. They are subject both to California Corporations Code and to the California Education Code as well as the policies of the California State University and their individual campus.

Member organizations 

Agricultural Foundation of California State University, Fresno
Associated Students, Bakersfield
Associated Students, Cal Poly Pomona
Associated Students, Channel Islands
Associated Students, Chico
Associated Students, Dominguez Hills
Associated Students, East Bay
Associated Students, Fresno
Associated Students, Fullerton
Associated Students, Humboldt
Associated Students, Long Beach
Associated Students, Los Angeles
Associated Students, Maritime Academy
Associated Students, Northridge
Associated Students, Sacramento
Associated Students, San Bernardino
Associated Students, San Diego
Associated Students, San Francisco
Associated Students, San Jose
Associated Students, San Luis Obispo
Associated Students, San Marcos
Associated Students, Sonoma
Associated Students, Stanislaus
Aztec Shops
Cal Poly Corporation
Cal Poly Housing Corporation
The Cal Poly Pomona Foundation
Cal Poly Pomona University Educational Trust
Cal State East Bay Educational Foundation
California Maritime Academy Foundation
California Polytechnic State University Foundation
California State University, Bakersfield Auxiliary For Sponsored Programs and Administration
California State University, Bakersfield Foundation
California State University, Bakersfield Foundation for Research
California State University, Bakersfield Student Union
California State University, Channel Islands Foundation
California State University, Chico Research Foundation
California State University, Chico University Foundation
California State University, Dominguez Hills Foundation
California State University, East Bay Foundation
California State University Foundation
California State University, Fresno Association
California State University, Fresno Athletic Corporation
California State University, Fresno Foundation
California State University, Fullerton Auxiliary Services Corporation
California State University, Fullerton Housing Authority
California State University, Fullerton Philanthropic Foundation
California State University Institute
California State University, Long Beach Foundation
California State University, Los Angeles Auxiliary Services
California State University, Los Angeles Foundation
California State University, Los Angeles University Development Corporation
California State University, Los Angeles University-Student Union
California State University, Monterey Bay Employee Housing
California State University, Monterey Bay Foundation
California State University, Northridge Foundation
California State University, Northridge University Student Union
California State University, Sacramento University Union
California State University San Marcos Foundation
California State University, Stanislaus Auxiliary and Business Services
California State University, Stanislaus Foundation
California State University, Stanislaus University Union
The Campanile Foundation
Capital Public Radio
Donald P. Katherine B. Loker University Student Union
Forty-Niner Shops
Foundation for the California State University, San Bernardino
Franciscan Shops
Fresno State Programs for Children
Humboldt State University Advancement Foundation
Humboldt State University Center
Humboldt State University Enterprise Foundation
Humboldt State University Sponsored Programs Foundation
North Campus - University Park Development Corporation
San Diego State University Research Foundation
San Francisco State University Foundation
San Francisco State University Student Center
San Jose State University Research Foundation
San Marcos University Corporation
Santos Manuel Student Union
Sonoma State Enterprises
Sonoma State University Academic Foundation
Sonoma Student Union Corporation
Spartan Shops
The Student Union of San Jose State University
The Tower Foundation
University Auxiliary and Research Services Corporation
University Corporation at Monterey Bay
The University Corporation, Northridge
The University Corporation (San Francisco State University)
University Enterprises (California State University, Sacramento)
University Enterprises Development Group
The University Foundation at Sacramento State
University Glen Corporation

External links 
 AOA website

California State University auxiliary organizations
Supraorganizations